Carex communis, the fibrous-root sedge, is a species of flowering plant in the genus Carex, native to central and eastern Canada and the central and eastern United States. Its seeds are dispersed by ants.

Subtaxa
The following varieties are accepted:
Carex communis var. amplisquama (F.J.Herm.) Rettig
Carex communis var. communis

References

communis
Flora of Eastern Canada
Flora of the North-Central United States
Flora of the Northeastern United States
Flora of the Southeastern United States
Plants described in 1889
Flora without expected TNC conservation status